Colaiacovo is a surname of Italian origin. Notable people with the surname include:

 Carlo Colaiacovo (born 1983), Canadian ice hockey player
 Paulo Colaiacovo (born 1983), Canadian ice hockey player

Italian-language surnames